Federal Route 205, or Jalan Kampung Gunong-Batu Melintang-Kampung Lawar, is a federal road in Kelantan, Malaysia.

Features
At most sections, the Federal Route 205 was built under the JKR R5 road standard, allowing maximum speed limit of up to 90 km/h.

List of junctions and towns

References

Malaysian Federal Roads